The 1872 North Nottinghamshire by-election was fought on 26 February 1872.  The byelection was fought due to the incumbent Liberal MP, Evelyn Denison, becoming a peer.  It was won by the Conservative candidate George Monckton-Arundell.

References

North Nottinghamshire by-election
North Nottinghamshire by-election
North Nottinghamshire by-election
19th century in Nottinghamshire
By-elections to the Parliament of the United Kingdom in Nottinghamshire constituencies